Jets Overhead is the debut self-titled extended play by Canadian alternative rock band Jets Overhead. The EP was released on December 20, 2003 and reached a respectable #42 on the College Media Journal chart.

Track listing
 "Addiction" - 4:38
 "Mirror Mirror" - 5:42
 "Take-Out" - 3:36
 "George Harrison" - 5:42
 "Sun Sun Sun" - 3:55

External links
 Jets Overhead official site

2003 EPs
Jets Overhead albums